The Socialist Revolutionary Workers' Party was an unregistered political party in South Korea.

On 5 February 2022, the Socialist Revolutionary Worker's Party agreed to merge into the Labor Party in order to create a unified socialist party in Korea, as well as assisting unified candidate Lee Baek-yun in the 2022 presidential election.

Leadership

Leaders of the Socialist Revolutionary Workers' Party
Leader (January 31, 2016 – January 21, 2017)
Yi Jong-hoe
Co-representative (January 22, 2017 – present)
Yi Jong-hoe
Jo Hui-ju

References

External links
 

2016 establishments in South Korea
Anti-capitalist organizations
Anti-imperialism in Korea
Anti-imperialist organizations
Anti-nationalism in Korea
Political parties established in 2016
Political parties disestablished in 2022
Socialist parties in South Korea